Geuer is a surname. Notable people with the surname include:

Margarita Geuer (born 1966), Spanish basketball player
Nicola Geuer (born 1988), German tennis player

See also
Neuer (surname)